Year 747 (DCCXLVII) was a common year starting on Sunday (link will display the full calendar) of the Julian calendar. The denomination 747 for this year has been used since the early medieval period, when the Anno Domini calendar era became the prevalent method in Europe for naming years.

Events 
 By place 

 Byzantine Empire 
 Arab–Byzantine War: Emperor Constantine V destroys the Arab fleet off Cyprus, with the aid of ships from the Italian city-states, breaking the naval power of the Umayyad Caliphate.

 Europe 
 August 15 – Carloman, mayor of the palace of Austrasia, renounces his position as majordomo, and withdraws from public life. He retires to a monastery near Rome, being tonsured by Pope Zachary, and leaves his brother Pepin the Short as sole ruler (de facto) of the Frankish Kingdom. 
 Bubonic plague breaks out in Sicily, Calabria (Southern Italy), and Monemvasia (modern Greece).

 Islamic Empire 
 June 9 – Abbasid Revolution: Abu Muslim Khorasani, Persian military leader from Khorasan, begins an open revolt against Umayyad rule, which is carried out under the sign of the Black Standard. Close to 10,000 Muslims, primarily Khorasani Persians are under his command, when the hostilities officially begin in Merv (modern Turkmenistan).

 Asia 
 Chinese forces under Gao Xianzhi (a Korean in Tang employ) defeat the Arabs and Tibetans, by rapid military expeditions over the Pamir Mountains and Hindu Kush. About 72 local Indian and Sogdian kingdoms become Tang vassals. Over the next two years he establishes complete control in East Asia.
 Emperor Xuan Zong abolishes the death penalty in China, during the Tang Dynasty (approximate date).
 Empress Kōmyō founds the Shin-Yakushi-ji Buddhist temple in Nara (Japan).

Births 
 Benedict of Aniane, Frankish monk (approximate date)
 Charlemagne, king and emperor of the Franks (or 748)

Deaths 
 May 16 – Petronax, Italian monk and abbot (b. 675)
 August 13 – Wigbert, Anglo-Saxon monk
 October 26 – Witta of Büraburg, Anglo-Saxon missionary

Date Unknown
 Cú Chuimne, Irish monk
 Dunn, bishop of Rochester
 Fiachna ua Maicniadh, Irish abbot
 Li Shizhi, chancellor and poet of the Tang Dynasty
 Sulayman ibn Hisham, Arab general

References